In music a voluntary is a piece of music, usually for an organ, that is played as part of a church service. In English-speaking countries, the music played before and after the service is often called a 'voluntary', whether or not it is so titled.

The title 'voluntary' was often used by English composers during the late Renaissance, Baroque, and Classical periods. Originally, the term was used for a piece of organ music that was free in style, and was intended to sound improvised (the word voluntary in general means "proceeding from the will or from one's own choice or consent"). This probably grew out of the practice of church organists improvising after a service.  The style is in almost complete contrast to the liturgical  chorale preludes of J S Bach and others, where the composition is almost invariably based round the theme of a seasonal chorale (Lutheran hymn).

Later, the English voluntary began to develop into a more definite form, though it has never been strictly defined. Many composers wrote voluntaries, including Orlando Gibbons, John Blow, Henry Purcell, William Boyce, John Stanley, Handel and Thomas Arne. Often, when English music printers published continental organ music, they would, by default, title the works as 'voluntaries', though the word was not used by composers in continental Europe.

English organ voluntaries of the late Baroque 

During the late 17th century, a 'voluntary' was typically written in a fugal or imitative style, often with different sections. 

In the 18th century, many organists and other musicians of high prominence, particularly in London, published collections of voluntaries - usually ten or twelve -'for organ or harpsichord', establishing the genre as a serious addition to the standard repertoire.  Whilst almost always the harpsichord is indicated alongside the organ, subsequent markings which frequently appear in the music, such as swell or eccho suggest the organ was the chief instrument in mind.  

The form typically begins with a short slow movement followed by a contrasting more substantial fast movement, either a fugue or movement for a solo stop on the organ. Two movements are very common although three and four are also encountered.  Some imitate the character of the French overture, with a slow movement of dotted or double-dotted rhythms, followed by a fugue.  Others begin with a slow movement making use of close-written harmony and suspensions, followed by solo writing for the right hand and one-line accompaniment for the left hand, such as the trumpet voluntary or the cornet voluntary. (It must be remembered that the pedal organ had not yet arrived in England, and did not do so until well into the 19th century.) In the latter the eccho manual and and/or the swell or full organ to give ripieno effects are often employed, and it is typically non-fugal.  At the time, organ builders such as Renatus Harris had been building organs with stops imitating certain instruments such as the trumpet and cornett.    Some composers, such as John Bennett (ca. 1735-1784) made more use of the slow introduction than, say, John Stanley whose introductory movements tend to be shorter and simpler in comparison.  In Bennett's case, the introductions can easily stand alone as movements in their own right.  With most composers, the slow introductory movement sometimes ends with an imperfect cadence inevitably leading into the next movement.  Others finish with a perfect cadence.  Many of the fast movements end with a short adagio section, particularly those of William Goodwin, John Bennett and, to a lesser extent, William Boyce.

In 18th century England, the word 'fuge' is often encountered.  English style 'fuges' (or fugue) do not follow the strict theoretical form of German-style fugues and are only notionally such. They are more related to the 'fugues' written by Italian composers of the time, being generally imitative without substantial development and length.

One noteworthy example of a substantial voluntary is that of Pepusch, which has 13 movements in total. Several of the movements are named after organ solo stops or mixtures (bassoon, cornet, trumpet, sesquialtera, flute, twelfth, etc.).  Pepusch had been the teacher of Bennett and other younger composers.

Some voluntaries were called double voluntaries. These were pieces written for organs with two manuals (keyboards). The pieces contrasted a loud manual with a soft one.

In general, the English organ voluntary of the 18th century arguably does not have the more profound, devotional flavour of the chorale prelude of, say, J S Bach who had died in 1750.  A new style was developing, the galant style, which emphasised lighter elegance.  The writing can be clichaic, based on rapid scales, arpeggios and sequences which sometimes can be perceived as superficial and repetitive.  Variation between the style of one composer and the next is sometimes not greatly obvious.  However, the very best still represent originality and exploit fully the possibilities of the instruments of the time.  Of the many composers active in London, those of Maurice Greene, William Goodwin and John Bennett arguably show the most inventiveness and variety in character.  The voluntaries of John Bennett demonstrate the greatest variety of textures and profundity of character.

See also 
Trumpet Voluntary
Fantasia (music)
Fugue

References

Classical church music